Rajapur is a town (Nagar Panchayat) and  tehsil of Chitrakoot district in the Indian state of Uttar Pradesh. It is situated along the bank of river Yamuna. It has its nickname as "Tulsi Dhaam" after great Hindi poet Goswami Tulsidas, who is the writer of holy "Ram Charit Manas" along with many other religious books of Hindus. There is a temple devoted to Tulsidas where part of the original "Hand written Scripture" of Ramcharitmanas is still available, although some pages may be missing. Rajapur is linked  with Kaushambi district on the opposite bank of river Yamuna.

Tourist attractions
Places like Hanuman ji temple, Tulsighat, Tulsi smarak are some of the places of interest in the town for local people as well as people from nearby villages. Being the birthplace of saint poet Goswami Tulsidas it is visited by many other people from all parts of the country. Tulsi ghat is a nice place to spent some time in morning and evening because of scenic beauty of this place and breeze. Chitrakoot which is district headquarter is also a very famous tourist attraction only 50 km from Rajapur. Apart from this there is a place called Nadi taura, 18 km from Rajapur, where a famous hanuman ji temple is situated.

Demographics
As per the 2011 Census of India, Rajapur had a population of 17,439. Out of it 97% are Hindu and 2.28% are Muslims. Rajapur has an average literacy rate of 70.38%, male literacy rate is 77.98% and female literacy rate is 61.73%. In Rajapur, 20% of the population is under 6 years of age.

Education

Higher Education
 Sri Tulsi Smarak Sanskrit Mahavidhalaya, Rajapur
 Sri Kedarnath Jagannath Mhavidhalaya, khatwara, Rajapur
 Sri Kedarnath Ramswarup Mhavidhalaya, Khatwara, Rajapur
 Sri Vashishth Narayan Karwariya Mhavidhalaya, Rajapur

Schools
 Govt. Girls Inter College
 Sri Tulsi Inter College (govt.) 
 Dhirendra Inter College
 Jitendra Higher Secondary School
 Primary School Rajapur
 Sarswati Shishu Vidhya Mandir nandin kurmiyan
 S.M. Public School
 Angel English Medium School

Transportation
Rajapur town is connected with some major cities like District headquarter Chitrakoot, Allahabad, Kanpur, Lucknow etc. by National highway and state highway.  

Railway: The nearest railway station is Chitrakoot Dham Karwi (CKTD) which connects Banda, Jhansi, Kanpur and Delhi line on one side and Allahabad, Varanasi on another side. Another railway junction is Manikpur (MKP) which connects Katni, Jabalpur, Bombay line on one side and Allahabad, Varanasi, Patna on other side. Although road connectivity for Manikpur railway junction is required to be improved from existing single lane road to two lane highway because of its utility.

Air: The nearest airport is at Bamrauli near Allahabad which is approximately 80 km away from Rajapur. Lucknow airport ( Chaudhary Charan Singh International Airport) which has frequent flights for major cities of the country, is nearly 180 km away from the town.

Economy
People of the town are mostly dependent on self business. Industrial development is almost nil, however small scale production of agro/food products may be there for sell at local market. Some of the families own farm land so practice agriculture and vegetable production. There is a good level of attention towards education and thereby jobs in government as well as private sector. Well educated youth are serving the country in the various positions including software industry, education, service sector, and public administration.

References

Cities and towns in Chitrakoot district